The 1951 St. Bonaventure Bonnies football team, sometimes also referred to as the St. Bonaventure Brown Indians, was an American football team that represented St. Bonaventure University during the 1951 college football season. In its second season under head coach Joe Bach, the team compiled a 5–4 record and outscored opponents by a total of 218 to 175. The team played its home games at Forness Stadium in Olean, New York.

Quarterback Ted Marchibroda led the team on offense. In nine games, Marchibroda completed 72 of 170 passes for 1,146 yards and 12 touchdowns. Halfback Jerry Hanifin led the team's rushing attack.

In December 1951, one month after the season ended, coach Bach left the team to become head coach of the Pittsburgh Steelers. 

In February 1952, St. Bonaventure announced that it was suspending competition in intercollegiate football. The school's president, Rev. Juvenal Lalor, stated that the decision was prompted by "ever increasing costs in every department and steadily declining income." The decision was part of a trend among Catholic universities in the post-war years to terminate their football programs. The trend included Portland (1949), Saint Louis (1949), Duquesne (1950), Georgetown (1950), Saint Mary's (1950), Loyola of Los Angeles (1951), San Francisco (1951), and Santa Clara (1952).

Schedule

References

St. Bonaventure
St. Bonaventure Brown Indians football seasons
St. Bonaventure Bonnies football